Mahama Johnson Traoré (1942–2010) was a Senegalese film director, writer, and co-founder of the Ouagadougou-based Pan-African Cinema Festival (FESPACO).

Biography
Traoré was born in 1942 at Dakar. The son of a businessman, Traoré studied in Senegal, Mali and France to be an electrical engineer.  In Paris he quit his studies to follow a passion for film.  There he enrolled in the Conservatoire libre du cinéma français, an avant-garde school inspired by current German and Italian cinema and the theoretical approaches of the French ORTF.

He married Rokhaya Daba Diop and has 4 kids: Ken Alice Traoré, Sidy Mahama Traoré Jr., Awa Tamaro Traoré and Kani Diarra Traoré.

Films
Traoré became one of the premier filmmakers of the post-independence generation, associated with artists such as Sembene Ousmane.  Traoré made a number of Wolof language films with strong social messages from the late 1960s to the early 1980s.  His best known films were "Diankha-bi" ("the Young Girl" in Wolof), 1968, which won the Grand Prize at the Dinard film Festival, and its sequel "Diègue-Bi" ("the Young Woman", 1970).  Both had a strong feminist character which reappeared in his works, along with concerns for Pan-Africanism and struggle against unjust authority.  All these were combined in another well known work, "Njangaan" (The Disciple, 1975), which follows a young boy, escaping an abusive father, who falls prey to an equally abusive religious teacher.  Papers noted the coincidence that Traoré had died on 2010's International Women's Day.

Traoré was working on an historical drama (Nder ou les flammes de l’honneur), co-written with Algerian producer Mariem Hamidat, at the time of his death.  It is a story of the women of the town of Nder in the Senegalese Waalo Kingdom who committed suicide rather than surrender to the Maure invaders in 1820.

Cultural activities
Traoré was one of the founders in 1969 of the prestigious Pan-African Cinema Festival FESPACO, and the Carthage Film Festival.  From 1975 to 1983 he was secretary general of the Pan-African Federation of Film-makers (Fédération panafricaine des cinéastes FEPACI). From 1983 to 1985 he was Director of the Société nationale de production cinématographique du Sénégal (SNPC).  In all these offices he played a prominent role in the relations between African states and filmmakers.  One academic quotes him saying that there was not a single film made in Senegal during the 1970s that did not receive some form of state support from organs of government such as SNPC, the "Acualities Senegalaise", and the "Service du Cinema", which provided films for government ministries, often without ministerial control over subject or content.  In a 1983 piece he called this relationship, common in Francophone West Africa at the time, "cultural bribery."

He was also founder, editor, and publisher from 2008 of the PanAfrican arts magazine, Cahiers d’Afrique. Active with FESPACO and film making up until his death, in 2009 he was made Chevalier de l’Ordre des arts, des lettres et de la communication by the government of  Burkina Faso. In July 2009, he served as a Jury Member at the Second Festival culturel panafricain d’Alger (PANAF).

Death
He died on 8 March 2010 in Paris, after suffering a long term kidney illness, and was interred in the Muslim cemetery of Yoff, near Dakar.

Filmography
1969 : Diankha-bi (The young girl)
1969 : L’Enfer des innocents
1970 : Diègue-Bi (The young woman)
1971 : L’Étudiant africain face aux mutations
1971 : L’Exode rural
1972 : Lambaye
1972 : Reou-taax  (the Town)
1974 : Garga M’Bossé (the Cactus)
1975 : Njangaan (the Disciple)
1980 : Sarax si (the Alms)
1982 : La médecine traditionnelle

References

External links
 Portrait sur Africultures
 « L'Islam noir n'est pas violent », entretien avec Mahama Johnson Traoré, propos recueillis par Mame M'Bissine Diop (Africultures, n° 47, avril 2002)
 « Mahama Johnson Traoré », article de M’Bissine Diop dans Africultures, n° 47, avril 2002

1942 births
2010 deaths
People from Dakar
Senegalese film directors
Senegalese film producers